Tho Kyaung Bwa (also known as Sao Kem Hpa) was sawbwa (ruler) of Onbaung from  1400s to  1420s. He was a vassal and/or ally of King Minkhaung I of Ava.

Standard chronicle narrative
According to the standard royal chronicles, he became a vassal of Ava in 1404/05. In a marriage of state, he married a niece of King Minkhaung I of Ava. In 1412/13, he reported to the Ava court that his Shan-speaking state had come under attack from the neighboring Shan state of Hsenwi (Theinni), backed by Ming China. Minkhaung sent his son Crown Prince Minye Kyawswa to drive out the Hsenwi and Chinese forces.

The next ruler of Onbaung mentioned in the standard royal chronicles is Le Than Bwa (Hsan Hpa) in 1425. The main chronicles do not say when exactly Tho Kyaung Bwa ceased to be the sawbwa or if and how Le Than Bwa was related to him.

Hsipaw chronicle narrative
The Shan language chronicle Hsipaw Yazawin (Onbaung Hsipaw Chronicle) however  says that he was an ally of King Minkhaung. According to the chronicle, it was Minkhaung that submitted to the sawbwa in February 1415 after the sawbwa had marched and encamped in Sagaing across from the capital Ava (Inwa). The king of Ava gave his niece Sanda in marriage.

The chronicle also says he was the father of Hsan Hpa (Le Than Bwa), the next sawbwa of Onbaung–Hsipaw.

Notes

References

Bibliography
 
 
 
 
 

Ava dynasty
People from Hsipaw